Urban Splash was founded in 1993 by Chairman Tom Bloxham MBE and Creative Director Jonathan Falkingham MBE; the company has spent more than two decades working with architects and designers to restore old buildings and create new, sustainable communities.

Headquartered in Castlefield, Manchester, with regional bases in Liverpool, Leeds, Bristol, Sheffield, Cambridgeshire and Plymouth. The company has won over 450 awards for architecture and regeneration, including 46 RIBA awards. 

In September 2012, the company reported pre-tax losses of £9.3 million and debts of £234.4 million for the previous year. In 2014, Urban Splash was refinanced and restructured.

In its annual results published in September 2021, Urban Splash announced a 22% increase in turnover – with £39.4 million of sales. The company also recorded an increase in the value of its tangible fixed assets which now exceed £100 million – a £5m growth on the prior year – as well as a retained profit of £0.9 million.

House by Urban Splash, a subsidiary founded in 2016 and spun-out in 2019, went into administration in 2022 with 160 staff made redundant and combined debts of over £19 million.

Projects

Established in 1993, the company has transformed disused buildings across the United Kingdom, with schemes including New Islington in Manchester where it has created hundreds of homes, one third of them affordable. Writing about New Islington in 2021 the Manchester Evening News said: “Walk through New Islington, with its peaceful waterways and cool independent bars, and it’s not such a giant leap to pretend you’re in Amsterdam, or Copenhagen. The aesthetics and atmosphere are unlike anywhere else in Manchester”.

Other notable developments include Chimney Pot Park in Salford, Lister Mills in Bradford, Saxton in Leeds, Park Hill in Sheffield, The Vanilla and Tea Factories and The Matchworks in Liverpool, The Rotunda and Fort Dunlop in Birmingham, Lakeshore in Bristol, Stalybridge and Plymouth (Royal William Yard).

The success in transforming these projects has been documented in the press with articles on Chimney Pot Park in Salford in The Times.

The Observer wrote about Park Hill: "The cleverly planned, well-dimensioned flats have been reinstated, but with bigger windows and greater openness than before. The streets in the sky are back". The Guardian also wrote about Park Hill's “new lease of life”.

In September 2008, Urban Splash announced it would be making significant redundancies due to the downturn in the UK property market. This downturn has led to delays on some projects.

In March 2010, it was announced by Urban Splash that they would be drawing up plans for an £80 million project to renovate the Pleasureland Southport site and construct an outdoor heated swimming pool, while expanding the marine lake and construct a winter garden, which will all be housed under a landmark atrium inspired by the Eden project. Plans were abandoned in 2012 after the viability of the project was hit by recession.

In 2012, Lakeshore's residents moved into the old tobacco factory in Bristol, a highly sustainable apartment complex. The apartments come complete with underfloor heating powered by a Biomass Boiler and a guide promoting sustainable living as part of the package. As of 19 February 2015, Urban Splash sold the freehold of the site to Adriatic Land 3 Limited.

In October 2013, Urban Splash sold one of their undeveloped acquisitions – the former Sunbeam motorcycle factory site, off the Penn Road island in Wolverhampton – which had been disused since 1999. Property developer and former rugby player Liam Wordley bought the site, traditionally known as Sunbeamland, with the intention to convert for residential use.

In 2014, Urban Splash refinanced £135 million of debt in conjunction with entering into a joint venture with The Pears Group, and restructured itself.

In the wake of the Grenfell Tower fire, a number of buildings developed by Urban Splash were reported to have been constructed using unsafe cladding. In January 2018, Chips, Manchester failed a Greater Manchester Fire and Rescue Service risk assessment after the cladding on the building was found to have "non fire retardant" written on it. The cladding was then removed at the residents' expense.
In November 2018, the BBC reported that the cladding on the redeveloped Saxton Parade building in Leeds was combustible and did not meet current or previous building standards.

In 2020, Swansea Council announced that Urban Splash would be its preferred development partner for a number of key sites, including the Civic Centre, Swansea Central north and a plot of land running alongside the River Tawe in the St Thomas area of the city.

In late 2022 the company acquired more land at New Islington in Manchester.

House by Urban Splash
Urban Splash's modular houses were launched in 2016 at New Islington in Manchester, where all 43 properties sold out and fully occupied. At the time the Telegraph said that the scheme was "the blueprint for a pioneering housing concept" while the Sunday Times said that it would "turn buyers from passive consumers into the architects of their own dream homes". Wallpaper* magazine said that the concept would "make volume housebuilders sit up and take notice".

The modular housing concept evolved further in March 2018 with the launch of 10 Fab Houses, two storey modular homes created in the factory and designed by architect George Clarke.

In 2019, the modular operation was demerged from Urban Splash when Japan's biggest house builder Sekisui House and Homes England invested £55m in the business. In 2022, House by Urban Splash went into administration with 160 staff made redundant at its Derbyshire factory and at sites across the country. The collapsed business owed a combined £19.2 million to dozens of companies. Administrators said the business failure was due to "the under-performance of its modular facility, which has been loss-making for a prolonged period"; the underperformance was due to multiple factors including "design issues resulting in production defects and re-working the modular units, the costs of which could not be passed on" while the factory also suffered from "underutilisation and inability to absorb overhead costs."

Urban Splash commercial portfolio
As well as residential developments, Urban Splash has also delivered 1.5m of workspace across its projects, from Ducie House in Manchester to The Matchworks and Ropewalks in Liverpool, Fort Dunlop in Birmingham and Royal William Yard in Plymouth. Notable past occupiers include 808 State, Simply Red, Cream, The Farm and The La's. In 2021 it announced it had completed 230,000 sq ft of commercial deals during the year.

In July 2022, Urban Splash completed a deal with Aviva Investors to secure £43.5m to invest in its commercial portfolio in Manchester and Liverpool.

The Urban Splash Residential Fund
In 2017 the Urban Splash Residential Fund was formed to acquire design-led homes in urban regeneration areas across the UK - both through the Urban Splash pipeline and through opportunistic acquisitions.

Today the fund owns and manages homes across five different UK cities including Manchester, Birmingham, Sheffield, Bradford and Bristol. The fund's current net asset value is c.£40m, with average occupancy of 97% and annual investor returns of 9.5%.

In August 2022, the Fund's latest results showed it had tripled in value, with net asset value at £90.3m. It also posted a profit of £2.2m, a 70% rise on the £1.3m recorded in 2021. The fund also invested  £30m in new acquisitions during the reporting period, taking the portfolio to 252 homes in six UK cities.

In late 2022, the Fund acquired Derwent House in Birmingham.

Publications
In 2012, the company published a book documenting its relationship with architects and the schemes it had completed. Entitled Transformation, the book was reviewed in The Times who said: "When it comes to rescuing the great industrial landmarks of the past, Urban Splash is in a class of its own”.

In 2018, celebrating its 25th anniversary, the company published a second book entitled “It Will Never Work”.

Founders
Urban Splash was founded by Tom Bloxham, a graduate of the University of Manchester, and Jonathan Falkingham, an architecture graduate from Liverpool University. Bloxham's initial business experience was selling pop posters in Affleck's Palace in Manchester. Bloxham branched out as a landlord opening the Northern Quarter Arcade adjacent to Affleck's Palace. He then expanded into Liverpool, opening a shopping arcade called the Liverpool Palace and then into licensed premises with the founding of the Baa Bar in Liverpool together with Falkingham.

References

External links
 Official site

Companies established in 1993
Companies based in Manchester
Town and country planning in the United Kingdom
Urban Regeneration Companies
Urban society in the United Kingdom
1993 establishments in the United Kingdom